Banbhore Division, also known as "Thatta Division" or "Bhambore Division", is the sixth administrative division of Sindh as announced by the People's Party's Sindh Government. The name of division is derived from the ancient city of Banbhore. The planned capital of this division is the city of Thatta. In addition to Thatta District itself, plans exist to incorporate the districts of Sujawal and Badin into Banbhore Division; prior to this change, all three of these districts were included in the Hyderabad Division. Sindhi nationalists appreciated this change as they believe it will improve the governance and infrastructure development of region. The Sindh Government also allocated a budget of 11 billion rupees for the development of Banbhore Division.

History 

The Sindhi Nationalists wanted a new division from the existing Hyderabad it was part of. In 2012, when Badin was badly flooded
by a seasonal monsoon, Hyderabad management failed to rescue Badin and provide disaster management in the aftermath. Therefore, in the 2013 regional election, people demanded a separate division as a condition of voting for the People's Party. In the People's Party's election campaign, the party accepted the demand and it was successful in gaining majority seats in these areas. It was also important to make another administrative division for better governing and development in the region.

References 

Divisions of Sindh